

Final result

Women's cross-country
UCI